Bridestowe railway station served the 2 miles or so distant village of Bridestowe in West Devon, England, located outside Okehampton on the edge of Dartmoor.

History
It was built by the Okehampton Railway, an independent company that was supported by the London and South Western Railway (LSWR). Before construction began the line was leased to the LSWR and an extension authorised to Lidford. This was almost the highest point on the LSWR line.

Renamed as the Devon and Cornwall Railway and construction began in 1864 and the line to Lidford was opened on 12 October 1874. Lidford was renamed as Lydford on 3 June 1897. 
The Devon and Cornwall Company was taken over by the LSWR in 1872, which was in turn incorporated into the Southern Railway in the grouping of railways in 1923.

When rabbit warrening was an important rural industry on Dartmoor, Bridestowe sent away annually many more rabbits than passengers, mostly to London. It was used by several Dartmoor mining industries and also the Rattlebrook Peatworks which closed in 1921; it was an ordnance depot during the Second World War. The Goods Yard closed in 1961 and the staffed became unstaffed in September 1965.The station was closed in 1968 together with the stretch of line from Okehampton to Bere Alston.

Since closure the disused railway station has been converted to a private dwelling.

References
Notes

Sources

 
 Nicholas, John (1992). The North Devon Line. Sparkford: Oxford Publishing Company. .
 

Railway stations in Great Britain opened in 1874
Disused railway stations in Devon
Former London and South Western Railway stations
Railway stations in Great Britain closed in 1968
Beeching closures in England